ORP Grom is an Orkan-class fast attack craft.  It is the sister ship of Orkan and Piorun.

The ship was the result of a construction project undertaken by the German Democratic Republic for its navy, named Project 660 ("Sassnitz class" in NATO code). After the unification of Germany the unfinished hulls were bought by the Polish Navy from VEB Peenewerft shipyard in Wolgast and completed in Northern Shipyard in Gdańsk.

After its completion in 1995 the ship was incorporated into the 31st Rocket Warships Squadron, 3rd Ship Flotilla.

References

Orkan-class corvettes of the Polish Navy
1990 ships
Ships built in Wolgast